Cendrine Browne (born 8 September 1993) is a Canadian cross-country skier who competes internationally. She competed at the 2022 Winter Olympics, in Women's 10 kilometre classical, Women's 30 kilometre freestyle, Women's 15 kilometre skiathlon, Women's sprint, and Women's 4 × 5 kilometre relay.

Career
She competed for Canada at the FIS Nordic World Ski Championships 2017 in Lahti, Finland, and the 2018 Winter Olympics.

On January 13, 2022, Browne was officially named to Canada's 2022 Olympic team.

Cross-country skiing results
All results are sourced from the International Ski Federation (FIS).

Olympic Games

World Championships

World Cup

Season standings

References

External links

1993 births
Living people
Sportspeople from Barrie
Canadian female cross-country skiers
Cross-country skiers at the 2018 Winter Olympics
Cross-country skiers at the 2022 Winter Olympics
Olympic cross-country skiers of Canada

Université Laval alumni
21st-century Canadian women